The Akachi monument was a large sculpture situated along Aba Road, Owerri, Imo State in southeastern Nigeria. The monument was built on a reclaimed dumpsite and measured over 40 feet high. It was a massive tower with the symbol of a hand on the zenith which represents the hand of God. The sculpture was reserved for tourism purposes.

The monument was built by the former governor of Imo State, Rochas Okorocha and commissioned by Vice President Yemi Osinbajo. On 30 May 2019, an earth moving equipment demolished the monument during Emeka Ihedioha's administration as former governor of Imo state in 2019.

References

Monuments and memorials in Nigeria
Owerri
Demolished buildings and structures in Nigeria
Buildings and structures demolished in 2019